7-Dehydrocholesterol reductase, also known as DHCR7, is a protein that in humans is encoded by the DHCR7 gene.

Function 

The protein encoded by this gene is an enzyme catalyzing the production of cholesterol from 7-Dehydrocholesterol using NADPH.

The DHCR7 gene encodes delta-7-sterol reductase (EC 1.3.1.21), the ultimate enzyme of mammalian sterol biosynthesis that converts 7-dehydrocholesterol (7-DHC) to cholesterol. This enzyme removes the C(7-8) double bond introduced by the sterol delta8-delta7 isomerases. In addition, its role in drug-induced malformations is known: inhibitors of the last step of cholesterol biosynthesis such as AY9944 and BM15766 severely impair brain development.

Pathology 
A deficiency is associated with Smith–Lemli–Opitz syndrome.

All house cats and dogs have higher-than-usual activity of this enzyme, causing an inability to synthesize vitamin D due to the lack of 7-dehydrocholesterol.

Interactive pathway map

See also
 Steroidogenic enzyme

References

Further reading

External links 
  GeneReviews/NIH/NCBI/UW entry on Smith-Lemli-Opitz Syndrome
 
 

EC 1.3.1
Human proteins